Judikael Magique Goualy (born 21 January 1993 in Abidjan) simply Magique, is an Ivorian footballer who plays as a forward for Portuguese club SU Sintrense.

Football career
On 7 February 2012, Magique made his professional debut with Académica in a 2011–12 Taça da Liga match against Oliveirense.

Honours
Académica de Coimbra
Taça de Portugal: 2011–12

References

External links

Stats and profile at LPFP 

1993 births
Living people
Ivorian footballers
Association football forwards
Primeira Liga players
Liga Portugal 2 players
Associação Académica de Coimbra – O.A.F. players
C.D. Trofense players
C.D. Feirense players
C.D. Cova da Piedade players
TFF First League players
Şanlıurfaspor footballers
Ivorian expatriate footballers
Expatriate footballers in Portugal
Expatriate footballers in Turkey
Footballers from Abidjan
S.U. Sintrense players